Calling Out For You (2000) is a novel by Norwegian writer Karin Fossum. It features her series’ protagonist Inspector Sejer and his investigation into the vicious murder of an Indian bride recently moved to Norway to be with her husband. 

The novel was translated into English in 2005, and was shortlisted for the 2005 Crime Writers' Association Gold Dagger award, where the judges acclaimed it for having "real emotional power". It was published in America in 2007 under the title The Indian Bride.

2000 Norwegian novels
Novels by Karin Fossum
Novels set in Norway
Norwegian crime novels